Iratperiyakulam railway station ( Īraṟperiyakuḷam toṭaruntu nilaiyam) is a railway station in the town of Iratperiyakulam in northern Sri Lanka. Owned by Sri Lanka Railways, the state-owned railway operator, the station is part of the Northern Line which links the north with the capital Colombo. The popular Yarl Devi service calls at the station.

Railway stations in Vavuniya District
Railway stations on the Northern Line (Sri Lanka)